Sunrise on Slaughter Beach is the thirteenth studio album by American rock band Clutch. It was released on September 16, 2022, through the band's own label Weathermaker Music. It is Clutch's first studio album since Book of Bad Decisions in 2018. The album was originally intended as a positive counterpoint to the social volatility and divisiveness caused by the COVID-19 pandemic, but the lyrics eventually touched on a more diverse range of social topics.

Reception 

The album has an average score of 81 out of 100 on Metacritic based on 6 professional reviews, indicating "universal acclaim". According to Blabbermouth.net, the album fits within Clutch's long-term development, "never taking any drastic left turns, though progression and noticeable change has been evident over time." MetalSucks largely agreed, stating that "Sunrise on Slaughter Beach is your typical Clutch record," but "there’s always a little more going on under the hood of any Clutch offering." 

Kerrang! offered a positive review, stating that "13 albums in, Clutch are still uniquely brilliant, master craftsmen of a form at once ingeniously simple and amazingly clever." Metal Injection called the album "grand without pomposity, experimental without an inch of fat and underwritten with grooves so thick you could build a bridge out of them." According to Metal Planet Music, "Clutch have delivered a monster album here. It’s dirty, sludgy, heavy as hell and trippy when it needs to be." According to Rock n' Load, "‘Sunrise on Slaughter Beach’ is a grand entrance into newfound Clutch territory not seen before. Whilst still harnessing their iconic sound, the band have managed to widen their range and prove themselves once more pioneers; unafraid of throwing out a curveball."

Track listing

Personnel 

Clutch
 Neil Fallon – vocals, rhythm guitar
 Tim Sult – lead guitar
 Dan Maines – bass
 Jean-Paul Gaster – drums, vibraphone

Additional personnel
 J. Robbins – theremin
 Deborah Bond – backing vocals
 Frenchie Davis – backing vocals

Production
Tom Dalgety – production, mixing

Charts

References 

2022 albums
Clutch (band) albums